Franco Ángelo Cabrera Torres (born 1 May 1983) is a Chilean footballer who last played for Santiago Morning in the Primera B de Chile.

Honours

Club
Melipilla
 Primera B (2): 2004, 2006

Universidad de Concepción
 Copa Chile: 2008–09

References

External links
 
 

1983 births
Living people
Footballers from Santiago
Chilean footballers
Primera B de Chile players
Segunda División Profesional de Chile players
Chilean Primera División players
Deportes Melipilla footballers
Universidad de Concepción footballers
Unión San Felipe footballers
Deportes Iberia footballers
Coquimbo Unido footballers
Ñublense footballers
Santiago Morning footballers
Association football goalkeepers